= Sera A =

- Founded: 2001; 25 years ago
- Country: Somaliland

The Sera A is the top-level of association football in Somaliland. It was first contested in 2001.

== Champions ==
- 2001: ?
- 2003: Toghdeer
- 2004: Sanaag
- 2007: ?
- 2011: Hargeisa
- 2012: Maroodi-jeeh
- 2013: Maroodi-jeeh
- 2016: Awdal
- 2020: Daadmadheed
